Abdul Hadi Dawi ( 1894 - 1982) was an Afghan poet, diplomat and government official. His works were published under his pen name, Pareshan (worried).

Biography
Abdul Hadi Dawi was born to a Daavi Afghan family in 1894 in Kabul, Afghanistan. 
He graduated from Habibia High School in 1912. 
In 1919, Mahmud Tarzi turned over the editorship of Siraj al-Akhbar to him. 
Under Dawi's editorship, the name of the paper was changed to Aman-i Afghan (Afghan Peace).

In 1922, he was appointed as first ever Afghan Ambassador to London. From 1925 until his resignation in 1928, he served as a Minister of Commerce. After his resignation, he was appointed as an Afghan Ambassador to London where he served from 1929 until 1931. He was imprisoned from 1933 until 1946 as a supporter of Amanullah Khan.

In 1950, Dawi was elected to the Afghan parliament and was appointed as the speaker of the House for term 1949–1951. During this time, he also served as secretary of King Mohammad Zahir Shah and tutor of the crown prince. He was appointed as ambassador to Cairo from 1952 to 1954, and to Jakarta from 1954 until 1958. In 1961, Zahir Shah appointed Abdul Hadi Dawi president of the Mesherano Jirga (House of Elders), and he was reappointed several times until the King was overthrown.

Abdul Hadi died in 1982 in Kabul.

References 

Presidents of the House of Elders (Afghanistan)
20th-century Afghan poets
Pashtun people
1894 births
1982 deaths
Trade ministers of Afghanistan
Speakers of the House of the People (Afghanistan)
Ambassadors of Afghanistan to the United Kingdom
Ambassadors of Afghanistan to Egypt
Ambassadors of Afghanistan to Indonesia